K.F.C. Turnhout is a Belgian football club, from the municipality of Turnhout.

History
K.F.C. Turnhout was founded as Turnhout Sport in 1912 with matricule n°148. After World War I, the club was refounded as F.C. Turnhout with the same matriculation. Turnhout managed to advance through the lower leagues, to play twice in the first division: in 1931 and 1936.

The second division was their main stay afterwards, until the club was relegated to the third division in 1952. That same year the club was awarded the Royal title Koninklijke, and was called K.F.C. Turnhout onwards. In 1963, again promotion to the first division was achieved, as second division club Thor Waterschei that came in second that year was faced with a bribery scandal. However, the next year, Turnhout itself came under suspicion, and the club was relegated from the top flight even though it finished third last in the standings that year.

The next seasons, Turnhout played in the second division, until it was relegated in 1977 to the third division, where they would stay until 1990. In 1991, the 25-year top scorer of the club and second division, Luc De Rijck, suffered a heart attack while visiting the club's physician. It became apparent later that the doctor had applied blood doping to the player, but because of a wrongful connection in the machinery, an air embolism developed in the player's body. The doctor later faced a criminal conviction.

During the 1990s, the club came close on several occasions to win promotion again to the first division, but failed each time in the play-offs. After financial problems, the club degraded to the fourth division, and the club's old ground, the Villapark, had to be sold. New management took over the club, and the club was renamed to K.V. Turnhout. In 2007, the club was sold to the Wadi Degla company of Egypt, which also owns Lierse S.K. During the 2009–10 season, both Turnhout and Lierse played in the second division, therefore Wadi Degla suspended sponsorship of Turnhout for a year.

Notable coaches
 Fuat Çapa (2001–04)
 René Desaeyere (2006–09)
 Luc Beyens (2009–)

Current squad
As of 25 February 2018.

References

External links
 Official website

 
Association football clubs established in 1912
Football clubs in Belgium
1912 establishments in Belgium
Organisations based in Belgium with royal patronage
K.V. Turnhout
Belgian Pro League clubs